The 1996 All-Ireland Under-21 Football Championship was the 33rd staging of the All-Ireland Under-21 Football Championship since its establishment by the Gaelic Athletic Association in 1964.

Kerry entered the championship as defending champions.

On 8 September 1996, Kerry won the championship following a 1–17 to 2–10 defeat of Cavan in the All-Ireland final. This was their eighth All-Ireland title overall and their second in successive championship seasons.

Results

All-Ireland Under-21 Football Championship

Semi-finals

Finals

Statistics

Miscellaneous

 The All-Ireland semi-final between Cavan and Meath is the first championship meeting between the two teams.
 The All-Ireland final between Kerry and Cavan is the first championship meeting between the two teams.

References

1996
All-Ireland Under-21 Football Championship